Alfonso Márquez (born April 12, 1972) is a Mexican umpire in Major League Baseball (MLB) who worked in the National League in 1999 and has worked throughout both major leagues since 2000. He was promoted to crew chief for the 2020 season, becoming the first full time Latino-born crew chief. Márquez wears uniform number 72, a number he shared with friend and National Hockey League linesman Stéphane Provost.

Early years
Márquez graduated from Fullerton Union High School in Orange County, California, in 1990.

Prior to working in MLB, Márquez umpired in the Arizona Fall League, Arizona Instructional League, Northwest League, Midwest League, California League, Southern League, and Pacific Coast League.

MLB career
Márquez worked his first MLB game on August 13, 1999, as the home plate umpire in the second game of a doubleheader between the Montreal Expos and Colorado Rockies. He was the first Mexican-born umpire in major league history. He worked 30 MLB games in his first season, and became a full-time MLB umpire in 2000; through the end of the 2016 season, he has umpired 2111 regular season MLB games and has issued 56 ejections.

Notable games
Márquez has officiated four World Series (2006, 2011, 2015, 2021), six League Championship Series (2003, 2008, 2013, 2016,2017, 2022), and 11 Division Series (2001, 2002, 2005, 2006, 2011, 2012, 2015, 2018, 2019, 2020, 2021), as well as the 2006 All-Star Game and 2018 All-Star Game.

Márquez was at second base on August 7, 2004, for Greg Maddux's 300th win.

Márquez was the third base umpire for the final Montreal Expos home game on September 29, 2004. The Florida Marlins defeated the Expos 9–1.

On July 2, 2011, Márquez ejected both Toronto Blue Jays manager John Farrell and pitcher Jon Rauch. In the top of the 9th inning, with the Blue Jays down a run, Shane Victorino of the Philadelphia Phillies singled, driving in Chase Utley, who was called safe at home by Márquez; Rauch was ejected for arguing the call, and Farrell was ejected for unsportsmanlike conduct. This incident gained some notoriety because of the size of Rauch and his anger towards Márquez. In the process, Rauch's jersey was ripped off and Farrell's jaw was dislocated by Rauch.

Marquez was the umpire at third base for Miguel Cabrera’s 3,000th career hit on April 23, 2022.

See also 

 List of Major League Baseball umpires

References

External links
Major league profile
Retrosheet

1972 births
Living people
Mexican emigrants to the United States
Sportspeople from Zacatecas
People from Zacatecas City
Major League Baseball umpires